Noël is a Christmas album and the fourth studio album by Josh Groban that was released on October 9, 2007. In the United States, the album is available as a single CD release in most retail stores. However, Target stores released a limited edition version of the album with a bonus DVD that features a "making of" documentary entitled The Making of Noël.

According to Nielsen SoundScan, the album sold 3,699,000 copies in 2007 after its release, making it the overall best-selling album in the US for all of 2007. It was also the best-selling holiday album in 2008, with sales of 915,000 copies. As of October 2015, the album has sold 5.8 million copies in the United States according to SoundScan, making it the second best-selling holiday album in the US in the Nielsen SoundScan era (March 1991–present) behind Kenny G's 1994 holiday set Miracles: The Holiday Album. According to Billboard, Noël is the second best-selling classical album of the 2000s decade in the US, behind Groban's own Closer.

On August 14, 2017, Noël was certified Sextuple Platinum by the Recording Industry Association of America, recognizing shipment of six million copies in the United States.

On October 12, 2017, Groban announced a tenth-anniversary deluxe edition, released on November 3. It includes six songs not featured in the initial release, including four new recordings.

Track listing
Standard and vinyl:
 "Silent Night" – 4:11
 "Little Drummer Boy" – 4:20 (featuring Andy McKee)
 "I'll Be Home for Christmas" – 4:15
 "Ave Maria" – 5:17
 "Angels We Have Heard on High" – 3:32 (duet with Brian McKnight)
 "The Christmas Song" – 3:54
 "What Child Is This?" – 3:53
 "The First Noel" – 4:34 (duet with Faith Hill)
 "Petit Papa Noël" – 4:05
 "It Came Upon the Midnight Clear" – 4:13
 "Panis angelicus" – 4:19
 "O Come All Ye Faithful" – 4:38 (with the Mormon Tabernacle Choir)
 "Thankful" (David Foster, Josh Groban, Alan Silvestri, Glen Ballard, Richard Page) – 4:50

2017 deluxe edition bonus tracks
 "White Christmas" – 3:57
 "Christmas Time Is Here" – 3:31 (duet with Tony Bennett)
 "Have Yourself a Merry Little Christmas (Piano/Vocal Version)" – 4:05
 "Happy Xmas (War Is Over)" – 3:27
 "Believe" (Foster, Groban, Silvestri, Ballard, Page) – 4:18
 "O Holy Night (Cantique de Noël)" – 4:49

Chart performance
Seven weeks after its release, Noël reached No. 1 on the U.S. Billboard 200 on the chart dated December 8, 2007. The album sold about 405,000 copies in the week it reached number one, rising from the number two position with an 81% sales increase. The week's sales corresponded to an appearance by Groban on The Oprah Winfrey Show during the highly anticipated annual Oprah's Favorite Things feature.

In the next week, the album stayed at No. 1 on the Billboard 200 and its sales increased further, by 33%, with 539,000 copies being sold that week.

In its 9th week, the album held the top spot with another 8% increase in sales, moving 581,000 copies, and increased yet again in its tenth week selling 669,000 copies, and again holding the number one spot.

The album has set numerous Billboard 200 records, starting with being the first Christmas album to spend four consecutive weeks at No. 1 in the chart's 51-year history, as well as being only the second Christmas album to ever spend four weeks at No. 1, tying with Elvis Presley's Elvis' Christmas Album. It is also the first album to spend four consecutive weeks at No. 1 and experience a sales increase each of those weeks since No Doubt's Tragic Kingdom album did so in December 1996. The 669,000 copies the album sold in its tenth week was the biggest single week tally for a Christmas album since  Kenny G's Miracles: The Holiday Album sold 819,000 copies in the Christmas week of 1994.  By its tenth week the album had already become the best selling album of 2007, scanning 2.8 million copies in only a little over two months of release, a rarity in the fast declining physical album market of the past few years.

In its 11th week it became the first album of 2007 to hold No. 1 for 5 weeks, and the first Christmas album ever to hold No. 1 on the Billboard 200 for 5 weeks in a row. In that fifth week at No. 1 it outsold Mary J. Blige's Growing Pains, selling about 757,000 copies.

As of December 2022, Noël has sold a total of 6.32 million copies in the United States, according to Nielsen Music.

Charts

Weekly charts

Year-end charts

Certifications

Awards

See also
 List of Billboard Top Holiday Albums number ones of the 2000s

References

Josh Groban albums
Albums produced by David Foster
2007 Christmas albums
Christmas albums by American artists
Pop Christmas albums
Classical Christmas albums